The women's kumite +68 kilograms competition at the 2018 Asian Games took place on 25 August 2018 at Jakarta Convention Center Plenary Hall, Jakarta, Indonesia.

Schedule
All times are Western Indonesia Time (UTC+07:00)

Results

Main bracket

Repechage

References

External links
Official website

Karate at the 2018 Asian Games
2018 in women's karate